The Memoriał Andrzeja Trochanowskiego (Andrzej Trochanowski Memorial) is a one-day cycling race held annually on 1 May in the Masovian Voivodeship, Poland. It was first held in 1989 and since 2005 has been part of the UCI Europe Tour as a 1.2 race beginning in Płońsk. The race is named after Andrzej Trochanowski, coach of Legia Warsaw and of the Polish national team.

In 2020 and 2021, it did not take place due to the COVID-19 pandemic.

Past winners

References

External links
 

Recurring sporting events established in 1989
Cycle races in Poland
Sport in Masovian Voivodeship
UCI Europe Tour races
1989 establishments in Poland
Spring (season) events in Poland